Canberra Community News was a newspaper published in Canberra, Australian Capital Territory (then known as the Federal Capital Territory), from 1925 until 1927.

History
The Canberra Community News was first published on 14 October 1925 and continued under the same name until 15 December 1927. It was published monthly by the Council of the Canberra Social Service Association.  From Volume 1 Number 3 the publisher changed to the Social Service department, Federal Capital Commission. Some sources state that Volume 2 Issues 4 through 11 were titled Community News, Canberra but the images of these issues show this not to be the case.

Digitisation
The newspaper has been digitised as part of the Australian Newspapers Digitisation Project  of the National Library of Australia.

See also
 The Federal Capital Pioneer
 List of newspapers in Australia

References

External links
 
 ACT Heritage Library Newspaper Holdings

1925 establishments in Australia
Publications established in 1925
Defunct newspapers published in the Australian Capital Territory